The Belgium national korfball team, nicknamed the Belgian Diamonds, is managed by the Koninklijke Belgische Korfbalbond (KBKB), representing Belgium in korfball international competitions.

The Koninklijke Belgische Korfbalbond was one of the founders of the International Korfball Federation, with the Dutch Federation, on 11 June 1933.

Tournament history

References

External links
 Koninklijke Belgische Korfbalbond

National korfball teams
Korfball
Korfball in Belgium